Kavita Daswani is an Indian-American author. All three of her novels deal with the Indian practice of arranged marriages, and features heroines that refuse to go along with tradition.

Career
She grew up in Hong Kong, starting her career at age 17 as a journalist for South China Morning Post. She moved to Los Angeles in 2000.

Her books represent the changes taking place in the diaspora Indian communities, especially regarding institutions such as marriage, the wife's role in families, and increasing opportunities for women. Daswani's combination of humor and culture tension make her books an escapist read.

She was once matched with a man in Nashik, India, who, it turned out, had spent two days in jail for having strippers in his bar.  

She has been a fashion correspondent for CNN, CNBC Asia, and Women's Wear Daily, has written for the Los Angeles Times and the International Herald Tribune, among many other publications, and has been the fashion editor for the South China Morning Post in Hong Kong.

References

1971 births
Living people
21st-century American novelists
American novelists of Indian descent
American women novelists
American women writers of Indian descent
American women journalists
American writers of Indian descent
Hong Kong people
21st-century American women writers
21st-century American non-fiction writers